Brigitte Leonce Suzanne Muir  (born 8 September 1958) is a Belgian-born Australian mountain climber. Her climbing career spanned over thirty years.

Early life and education
Muir was born Brigitte Koch in Ougrée, Belgium.

Climbing career

In 1986, she made, with husband at the time Jon Muir and friend Graeme Hill, the first ascent of the South West Pillar of Shivling in Northern India.

In 1997, she became the first Australian woman to summit Mount Everest and the first Australian, male or female, to climb the Seven Summits (the highest summit on each of the continents).

In 1998, Penguin (Viking) published her autobiography, The Wind in My Hair.

In 2008, SBS broadcast The Eighth Summit, a documentary directed and produced by wife and husband team Anne and Wayne Tindall, and based on Brigitte’s life.

After her career in mountaineering and adventure, Brigitte became a film maker and an inspirational speaker. She now leads community building treks in her beloved village of Lura in Eastern Nepal, where she started a women’s literacy and empowerment program.

Awards and Citations
Australian Geographic Society Spirit of Adventure Awards, 1997
Australia Day Achievers Award 1998
Order of Australia Medal, for services to mountaineering, 2000
Centenary Medal, For service to Australia through mountaineering, 2001
First Victorian Honour Roll of Women, 2001

Bibliography
Ross MacDowell, Inside Story. 20 Famous Australians Tell Their Story, Hobson Dell, Brighton,2001
Susan Geason, Australian Heroines, stories of courage and survival, ABC Books, Sydney, 2001
Martin Flanagan, Faces in the Crowd, One Day Hill, 2004
Everest. Reflections from the Top. Edited by Christine Gee, Garry Weare and Margaret Gee, Rider, 2003.

References

Other sources
 https://web.archive.org/web/20130430153031/http://www.curriculum.edu.au/cce/default.asp?id=17576
 http://www.girlsoutdoors.org/profiles/brigitte_muir_-_mountaineering/
 http://whoswhowomen.com.au/profile/brigitte-muir/

External links
 www.beyondthesmile.net

1958 births
Living people
Australian mountain climbers
Australian summiters of Mount Everest
Belgian emigrants to Australia
People from Seraing
Recipients of the Medal of the Order of Australia
Recipients of the Centenary Medal
Female climbers